The Road We Have Taken (simplified Chinese:人间正道是沧桑 ; traditional Chinese: 人間正道是滄桑), also known in short by its fans as simply "The Road" (正道) or "to go through all the vicissitudes" (滄桑), is a highly popular 2009 Chinese TV series produced by Jiangsu Broadcast Media Group .

The series is directed by Zhang Li, and is based on the award-winning novel of the same name by  Jiang Qitao (江奇涛).

Story

The series is about from 1925 to 1949, focuses on three children of a big family in Liling（醴陵）county，Hunan province（湖南） and their search for a political path in the chaos of 20th century China. Their life is set against a number of significant historic events, such as First United Front，Second United Front，the War of Second Sino-Japanese War (1937–45), Chinese Civil War and the foundation of the People's Republic of China.

Receptions 

The Road We Have Taken received high praise from TV audiences. Many rated the series highly, calling it "a milestone in Chinese TV productions" for the innovative break-away from the traditional style of war and historical dramas. The series' recreation of realistic battlefields and history was also praised by many.

External links
 The Road We Have Taken (Sina.com direct)

References

2009 Chinese television series debuts
2009 Chinese television series endings
China Central Television original programming
Television shows based on Chinese novels
Chinese historical television series